Edmund Hiram Sonnenblick (December 7, 1932September 22, 2007) was an American medical researcher and cardiologist. His studies of the function of cardiac muscle cells during the 1960s shaped the basis of both cardiovascular physiology and the modern treatment of cardiovascular disease, making possible the development of ACE inhibitors. In 1962, he was also credited as the first person to image the heart muscle under scientifically-controlled conditions using the electron microscope. Though Sonnenblick's ideas about the relationship between the structure and function of the human heart today constitute medical-scientific commonsense, they were utterly novel at the time.

Reflecting on Sonnenblick's discoveries, Harvard cardiologist Eugene Braunwald wrote that "Ed Sonnenblick occupies an honored place along with Ernest Starling, Carl Wiggers, and very few others in the pantheon of the greatest cardiovascular physiologists of the twentieth century." After Sonnenblick's death in 2007, a tribute published in the prominent peer-reviewed journal Circulation Research remembered Sonnenblick as "simply an intellectual giant in the field of cardiovascular research, and the work that he did will forever shape everyday treatments of heart disease."

Early life
Sonnenblick was born in New Haven, Connecticut on December 7, 1932 to Israel "Ira" and Rosalind Sonnenblick. Sonnenblick grew up in Hartford, Connecticut, and after graduating as the salutatorian of his high school class, he attended Wesleyan University.

Career
After completing his B.A. at Wesleyan University, Sonnenblick attended Harvard Medical School. He graduated cum laude in 1958, and began his residency at Columbia Presbyterian Hospital in New York. During his residency, Sonnenblick was credited as the first person to use the electron microscope for imaging the heart muscle under scientifically-controlled conditions when he compared measurements of heart muscle structure and the force of its contractions. With the completion of his residency at Columbia in 1960, he moved to the National Institutes of Health, where he would collaborate with figures like Stanley Sarnoff, Eugene Braunwald, and Henry Spotnitz.

During this period, Sonnenblick published his single-author paper, "Force-velocity relations in mammalian heart muscle" in 1962, which appeared in the American Journal of Physiology. In the paper, he showed that muscle mechanisms account directly for the quantity of blood pumped by the heart. Among other things, this finding provided justification for therapeutic afterload reduction. In 1963, he began investigating heart cell muscle contractions using quantitative electron microscopy. Sonnenblick argued that the positional relationship between filaments within heart muscle cells affects the force of those cells' contractions. Eugene Braunwald later told the New York Times that Sonnenblick's work was akin to "what a brilliant mathematician or theoretical physicist does that ultimately allows you to go into space."

Sonnenblick left NIH in 1968 and moved to Peter Bent Brigham Hospital. There, he served as Co-director of Cardiology with Richard Gorlin and Co-Director of Cardiovascular Research. He was also Associate Professor of Medicine at Harvard Medical School. In 1975, he relocated to New York City and was appointed the inaugural Director of the Cardiology Division at the Albert Einstein College of Medicine. He would serve in this capacity until 1996, when he was named Chief Emeritus and the Edmond J. Safra Distinguished University Professor of Medicine.

Over the course of his career, Sonnenblick trained more than 300 cardiologists and researchers, authored or co-authored over 600 articles, and made contributions to 16 textbooks on cardiovascular disease. He was also among the founding members of the Heart Failure Society of America.

Personal life
In 1954, Sonnenblick married Linda Bland, the daughter of Chester Bland, president of Colt's Manufacturing Company between 1955 and 1958. The couple had three daughters. Wesleyan University's annual Sonnenblick Lecture and Annie Sonnenblick Writing Award are named for their late daughter, Annie. His daughter, Charlotte Sonnenblick, is married to artist and author Adam Van Doren, grandson of Pulitzer Prize-winning poet, Mark Van Doren.

References 

American cardiologists
1932 births
2007 deaths
Wesleyan University alumni
Harvard Medical School alumni